= Edwin H. Meihofer =

American politician (1907–2003)

Edwin H. Meihofer (December 24, 1907 – January 14, 2003) was an American labor union activist and politician.

Meihofer was born in Saint Paul, Minnesota. He lived in Saint Paul, Minnesota with his wife and family and was involved with the Individual Truck Owners Union. Meihofer served in the Minnesota House of Representatives from 1945 to 1950 and was a Democrat.
